Heraclides or Heracleides, son of Antiochus, was hipparch  of the ile of Hetairoi from Bottiaea, from the Triballian campaign of  Alexander the Great in 335 BC until the battle of Gaugamela.

References
Who's Who in the Age of Alexander the Great by  Waldemar Heckel 

Hetairoi
Ancient Macedonian generals